The Table Talk of Samuel Marchbanks, published by Clarke Irwin in 1949, is the second of the Samuel Marchbanks books by Canadian novelist and journalist Robertson Davies. The other two books in this series are The Diary of Samuel Marchbanks (1947) and Samuel Marchbanks' Almanack (1967).

History
Davies created the Samuel Marchbanks character while he was the editor of the Peterborough Examiner newspaper in the small city of Peterborough, Ontario, northeast of Toronto. He wrote the first column under the Marchbanks pseudonym in 1944.

The Table Talk of Samuel Marchbanks presents a number of Marchbanks' columns  from 1947 and 1948, presenting them as observations purportedly made by Marchbanks during a seven-course formal dinner.

Davies' writings as Samuel Marchbanks were also collected in a one-volume edition, The Papers of Samuel Marchbanks in 1985.

Short story collections by Robertson Davies
1949 short story collections
Clarke, Irwin & Company books